Alishah or Ali Shah may refer to:
Ali Shah, East Azerbaijan
Alishah, Kurdistan
Alishah, Lorestan
Alishah, North Khorasan
Alishah, Pakistan
Omid Alishah, Iranian footballer